Queen City  may refer to:

Places
 Queen City, Iowa, a formerly inhabited place
 Queen City, Missouri
 Queen City, Texas

Place nicknames

Canada
 Vancouver, British Columbia
 Toronto, Ontario
 Montreal, Quebec
 Regina, Saskatchewan

New Zealand
 Auckland, New Zealand

Philippines
 Manila or Queen City of the Pacific
 Cebu City or Queen City of the South (de facto)
Iloilo City or Queen City of the South (de jure)
Naga or Queen City of Bicol

United States
 Gadsden, Alabama
 Selma, Alabama or Queen City of the Blackbelt
 Tuscaloosa, Alabama
 Anchorage, Alaska
 Camden, Arkansas or Queen City of the Ouachita River
 Eureka, California or Queen City of the Ultimate West
 Denver, Colorado or Queen City of the Plains
 Gainesville, Georgia
 Hazard, Kentucky or Queen City of the Mountains
 Bangor, Maine or Queen City of the East
 Cumberland, Maryland or Queen City of the Alleghenies
 Marquette, Michigan or Queen City of the North
 Traverse City, Michigan or Queen City of the North
 Virginia, Minnesota
 Greenville, Mississippi or Queen City of the Delta
 Meridian, Mississippi
 Sedalia, Missouri or Queen City of the Prairies
 Springfield, Missouri or Queen City of the Ozarks
 Helena, Montana or Queen City of the Rockies 
 Manchester, New Hampshire
 Beach Haven, New Jersey
 Plainfield, New Jersey
 Buffalo, New York or Queen City of the Great Lakes
 Elmira, New York
 New Rochelle, New York or Queen City of the Sound
 Poughkeepsie, New York or Queen City of the Hudson
 Charlotte, North Carolina or Queen City of the South
 Fargo, North Dakota
 Cincinnati, Ohio or the Queen City of the West
 Ada, Oklahoma or Queen City of the Chickasaw Nation
 Allentown, Pennsylvania
 Olyphant, Pennsylvania
 Titusville, Pennsylvania
 Sioux Falls, South Dakota
 Clarksville, Tennessee
 Del Rio, Texas or Queen City of the Rio Grande
 Burlington, Vermont
 Staunton, Virginia or Queen City of the Shenandoah Valley
 Virginia Beach, Virginia
 Seattle, Washington

See also
 List of city nicknames in Canada
 List of city nicknames in the United States
 Mother city (disambiguation)
 Mother of Cities (disambiguation)
 Name of Toronto